The Năndreasca is a right tributary of the river Bega in Romania. It flows into the Bega near Coșava.

References

Rivers of Romania
Rivers of Timiș County